Odesa State Environmental University is a university in Odesa, Ukraine.

History 
The university was founded on May 1, 1932 in Kharkiv as the Kharkiv Institute of Hydrometeorological Engineering. In the beginning of World War II the institute was evacuated to Ashgabat until August 1944. On July 4, 1944, it was relocated from Ashgabat to Odesa and renamed the Odesa Hydrometeorological Institute (OHMI). In 2001, the Odesa Hydrometeorological Institute received a new name - Odessa State Environmental University.

Education at the school

Institutes and faculties 

 Hydrometeorological Institute;
 Faculty of Ecology and Economics;
 Faculty of Conservation;
 Faculty of Computer Science;
 Faculty of Master's and Postgraduate Studies;
 Correspondence department.

Colleges 

 Odesa College of Computer Technology (formerly Odesa Machine Building College);
 Kharkiv Hydrometeorological College;
 Kherson Hydrometeorological College.

Other 

 Preparatory department;
 Center for Postgraduate Education;
 Center of Master's Training at the Naval Hydrophysical Institute of the National Academy of National Affairs of Ukraine;
 Department of Military Training (Ministry of Defence). 

Since 1993, the university has had a three-stage system of training specialists.

Graduates 
The University has produced more than 30,000 certified specialists. Since 1953, the university has been training foreign nationals; 1,600 engineers, researchers, and trainees. More than 200 personnel officers who are graduates of the university serve in the Armed Forces of Ukraine.

Notable alumni 

 Olena Khomrova. 
 Ivan Mishyn. 
 David B. Zilberman.

References

Official Website of the University (in Ukrainian)

Universities in Ukraine
1932 establishments in Ukraine
Universities and colleges in Odesa